Van Dillen is a surname. Notable people with the surname include:

Bob Van Dillen (born 1972), American meteorologist
Erik van Dillen (born 1951), American tennis player
Johannes Gerard van Dillen (1883–1969), Dutch economic historian
Oscar van Dillen (born 1958), Dutch composer

Surnames of Dutch origin